Rangia cuneata or Atlantic rangia, also known as wedge clam, gulf wedge clam, common rangia, and cocktail clam, is a mollusc native to Gulf of Mexico. It is an oval clam with body length of up to 5cm, living form the intertidal zone to depths of 124 meters. It is edible and is harvested for food in Mexico, and has been so since pre-Hispanic times.

Invasive species
Atlantic rangia have been introduced to US North Atlantic coast, Belgium (Antwerp) and the Baltic sea.

References

Mactridae
Molluscs of the Atlantic Ocean
Biota of the Gulf of Mexico
Taxa named by George Brettingham Sowerby I
Molluscs described in 1832